Bridge of Don is a ward represented in the Aberdeen City Council since 2017 by Sarah Cross of the Conservative Party, Alison Alphonse and Jessica Mennie, both of the Scottish National Party, and Nurul Hoque Ali of the Labour Party.

Boundaries
In the Fourth Statutory Review of Electoral Arrangements, conducted by The Local Government Boundary Commission for Scotland, and published in 2006, the ward is described to contain the whole suburb of the Bridge of Don.

Councillors

Election results

Elections of the 2020s

Elections of the 2010s

Elections of the 2000s

Notes

References

Wards of Aberdeen